Leptecophylla juniperina is a species of flowering plant in the family Ericaceae. The species is native to New Zealand and the Australian states of Tasmania and Victoria. The plant's fruit is edible, raw or cooked. Plants grow best in areas with moderate winters and cool moist summers.

Three subspecies are recognised as follows: 
Leptecophylla juniperina (J.R.Forst. & G.Forst.) C.M.Weiller subsp. juniperina (New Zealand and Tasmania)
Leptecophylla juniperina subsp. oxycedrus (Labill.) C.M.Weiller (Tasmania and Victoria)
Leptecophylla juniperina subsp. parvifolia (R.Br.) C.M.Weiller (Tasmania)

An example occurrence of L. juniperina is in the red and silver beech forests admixed with rimu and miro podocarps on northern South Island, New Zealand; associate understory species in this South Island forest include Blechnum discolor.

Common names
Common names in New Zealand include prickly heath and  prickly mingimingi. Maori names for this plant include hukihuki, hukihukiraho, inakapōriro, inangapōriro, kūkuku, miki, mikimiki, mingi, mingimingi ngohungohu, pā tōtara, taumingi, tūmingi.
In Australia, the subspecies parvifolia (syn. Cyathodes parviflora) is known as pink mountain berry.

References

Epacridoideae
Ericales of Australia
Flora of New Zealand
Flora of Victoria (Australia)
Flora of Tasmania
Garden plants